The Nickel ternary chalcogenides are a class of chemical compounds that contains nickel, a chalcogenide, and another element. Nickel forms a series of double nickel oxides with other elements, which may be termed "nickelates". These double nickel oxides are not listed on this page. There are also many well defined double compounds with sulfur, selenium and tellurium which are listed here.

References

Nickel compounds
Chalcogenides